At the 1908 Summer Olympics, four rowing events were contested, all for men only. Races were held at Henley-on-Thames. The competitions were held from 28 to 31 July. There was one fewer event in 1908 than 1904, after the double sculls was dropped from the programme. Hungary and Norway competed in rowing for the first time, along with six other nations.

Medal summary

Participating nations
81 rowers from 8 nations competed.

Medal table

References

External links
 International Olympic Committee medal database
 
 

 
1908 Summer Olympics events
1908
1908 in rowing
Regattas on the River Thames